This article contains a list of reconstructed words of the ancient Dacian language. They have been restored by some linguists from attested Dacian place and personal names (toponyms and anthroponyms) and from words believed to be Dacian relics in the modern Romanian and Albanian languages.

In the case of words reconstructed from onomastic evidence, the original meanings ascribed to the names in question are derived from examination of closely cognate words and placenames in other Indo-European languages, complemented by analysis of the historical evolution of such placenames. However, the results are hypothetical and subject, in many cases, to divergent etymological interpretations.

Reconstructions derived from Romanian and Albanian words are based on the unproven theory (with some linguists and historians, this theory has become an assumption ) that Dacian constitutes the main linguistic substratum of both languages, or the related theory that Dacian and early Albanian both descend from an immediate common ancestor.

Reconstruction of words from place and personal names

Methodology 

Both Georgiev and Duridanov use the comparative linguistic method to decipher ancient Thracian and Dacian names, respectively. 
 
Georgiev argues that one can reliably decipher the meaning of an ancient place-name in an unknown language by comparing it to its successor-names and to cognate place-names and words in other IE languages, both ancient and modern. He gives several examples of his methodology, of which one is summarised here:

The city and river (a tributary of the Danube) in eastern Romania called Cernavodă. In Slavic, the name means "black water". The same town in Antiquity was known as Άξίοπα (Axiopa) or Άξιούπολις (Axioupolis) and its river as the Άξιος (Axios). The working assumption is, therefore, that Axiopa means "black water" in Dacian. According to the known rules of formation of IE composite words, this breaks down as axi = "black" and opa or upa = "water" in Dacian (the -polis element is ignored, as it is a Greek suffix meaning "city"). The assumption is then validated by examining cognate placenames. The axi element is validated by a tributary of the Vardar called the Axios, which is today known as Crna reka (located in Republic of Macedonia  "black river") and by the older Greek name for the Black sea, Άξεινος πόντος (Axeinos pontos, later altered to the euphemism Euxeinos pontos = "Hospitable sea"). The opa/upa element is validated by the Lithuanian cognate upė ("river"). This etymology is questioned by Russu: Axiopa, a name attested only in Procopius' De Aedificiis, may be a corrupt form of Axiopolis. Even if correct, however, Russu's objection does not invalidate the decipherment of the axi- element.

Apart from Duridanov and Georgiev, other scholars have attempted to reconstruct Dacian and Thracian words. Russu (1967) attempted to decipher Thracian and Dacian onomastic elements (placenames and personal names) by reference to presumed proto-Indo-European roots-words. Georgiev considers such a methodology (known as Wurzeletymologien = "root-etymologies") to be "devoid of scientific value". This is because the root-words themselves are reconstructions, which are in some cases disputed and in all cases subject to uncertainty; multiple root-words can often explain the same word; and the list of proposed IE root-words may not be complete. Reichenkron (1966) assumed that so-called "substratum" words in Romanian (those whose etymology cannot be ascribed to any of the fully documented languages that have influenced Romanian: Latin, Slavic, Hungarian, Greek, Turkish etc.) are of Dacian origin. But Polomé considers that such a methodology is not reliable. This is because there is no guarantee that the substratum words are, in fact, Dacian. Instead, they could derive from other, unknown or little-known tongues at some period current in Dacia or Moesia: for example, possible pre-Indo-European language(s) of the Carpathians.

Methodological problems 

The methodology used by Georgiev and Duridanov has been questioned on a number of grounds, including:
 The phonetic systems of Dacian and Thracian and their evolution are not reconstructed from elements derived directly from the ancient languages in question but from their approximative Greek and Latin transcripts.  For example, Greek and Latin had no dedicated graphic signs for phonemes such as č, ġ, ž, š and others. Thus, if a Thracian or Dacian word contained such a phoneme, a Greek or Latin transcript would not represent it accurately. This could result in the wrong cognate being selected to decipher the Dacian name.
 The etymologies that are adduced to validate the proposed Dacian and Thracian vowel- and consonant- changes (that are, in turn, used for word-reconstruction by the comparative method) are open to divergent interpretations, since the material is strictly onomastic, with the exception of Dacian plant-names and of the limited number of glosses. Because of this, there are divergent and even contradictory assumptions for the phonological structure and development of the Dacian and Thracian languages.  Polomé (1982) notes that, in the case of personal names, the choice of etymology is often based on such assumed phonological rules. 
 Dana argues that both Georgiev and Duridanov ignore the context of the names and start from arbitrary assumptions, such as considering a name to be of Dacian origin simply because it is attested in Dacia. In Dana's opinion, the Dacian origin of some of the names is doubtful or even excluded. Also, Duridanov's method is unreliable because most of the names he considers are unique. 
 Dana questions the validity of the Baltic etymologies used to decipher the Dacian names.
 According to Messing, Duridanov's results are in contradiction with the reconstruction of a Balto-Slavic language group, as they show many parallels between Dacian and Baltic, but only a few with Slavic languages. (This objection is irrelevant if Baltic and Slavic constitute separate branches of IE (i.e. "Balto-Slavic" never existed, as some linguists maintain); or if, as Duridanov argues, Dacian acquired Baltic words through long-term proximity interaction with Baltic languages, rather than through a genetic link).

Despite these objections, Georgiev and Duridanov claim a high degree of reliability for their reconstructions. However, Polomé (1982), in his survey of the state of research into paleo-Balkan languages for Cambridge Ancient History, considers that only "20–25 Dacian, and 40–45 Thracian words have had reasonable, but not certain, Indo-European etymologies proposed".  This compares with c. 100 Dacian words reconstructed by Duridanov, and c. 200 Thracian words by Georgiev.

Reconstructed Dacian words 

Key
PN: placename
RN: river name
PRN: personal name
TN: tribal name
LN: lake name
SN: swamp name
MN: mountain name 
FN: field name 
PLN: plant name

Reconstruction from Romanian and Albanian words 

Georgiev, Duridanov and Russu concur that the Dacian language constitutes the main pre-Latin substratum of the modern Romanian language. Duridanov also accepts Georgiev's theory that modern Albanian is descended from Daco-Moesian. Where words in modern Albanian and/or Romanian can be plausibly linked to an Indo-European root and modern cognates of similar meaning, a reconstruction of the putative Dacian originals have been proposed by Duridanov, who included them in a separate list from words reconstructed from placenames.

CAVEAT: The following word-reconstructions are based on the assumption that the Albanian language is descended from Daco-Moesian. This theory is contested by many linguists, especially Albanian, who consider the language a direct descendant of the extinct Illyrian language. Thus, reconstructions based on modern Albanian words, or Romanian substratum words with Albanian cognates, may in reality represent ancient Illyrian, rather than Dacian, elements. In addition, the reconstructions below, unlike those in Table A above, are not validated by Dacian place- or personal names. The "Dacianity" of the reconstructions is therefore more speculative than those derived from placenames. (N.B. Even if Albanian is descended from Illyrian, the reconstructions below could nevertheless represent Dacian elements if the Daco-Illyrian theory - that the Dacian and Illyrian languages were closely related - is correct; or if the words below represent Illyrian borrowings from Daco-Moesian)

See also 
 List of Romanian words of possible Dacian origin
 List of Dacian plant names
 List of Dacian names
 Dacian language
 Baltic languages
 Thracian language
 Phrygian language
 Albanian–Romanian linguistic relationship
 Davae
 List of ancient cities in Thrace and Dacia

Notes

References

Ancient 

 Ammianus Marcellinus Res Gestae (c. 395)
 Dioscorides De Materia Medica (c. AD 80)
 Jordanes Getica (c. 550)
 Ptolemy Geographia (c. 140)
 Pseudo-Apuleius De Herbarum Virtutibus (5th century)
 Sextus Aurelius Victor De Caesaribus (361)
 Strabo Geographica (c. AD 20)
 Tacitus Germania (c. 100)
 Zosimus Historia Nova (c. 500)

Modern 

 
 
 
 
 
  Barrington Atlas of the Greek and Roman World (2000)
 
 CIL: Corpus Inscriptionum Latinarum
 
 
 
 
 
 
 Duridanov, I. (1969): Die Thrakisch- und Dakisch-Baltischen Sprachbeziehungen
 
 
 Jones, A. H. M. (1964): The Later Roman Empire, 284-602
 
 Lloshi, Xhevat (1999): Albanian in Handbuch der Südosteuropa Linguistik Band 10 (online)
 
 
 
 
 
 
 
 
 
 
 
 
 
 Renfrew, Colin (1987): Archaeology and Language: the Puzzle of Indo-European Origins
 
 
 
 
 
 
 
 
 Thompson, E.A. (1982): Zosimus 6.10.2 and the Letters of Honorius in Classical Quarterly 33 (ii)

Further reading 

 https://www.webcitation.org/5vSjj8iYr?url=http://soltdm.com/geo/arts/categs/categs.htm
 http://soltdm.com/sources/inscr/kaga/kaga_e.htm
 http://dnghu.org/indoeuropean.html  Indo-European Etymological Dictionary – Indogermanisches Etymologisches Woerterbuch (JPokorny). A database that represents the updated text of J. Pokorny's "Indogermanisches Etymologisches Wörterbuch", scanned and recognized by George Starostin (Moscow), who has also added the meanings. The database was further refurnished and corrected by A. Lubotsky.

External links 

 Sorin Olteanu's Project: Linguae Thraco-Daco-Moesorum – Toponyms Section

 
Balkans-related lists